The clarion (also rest or sufflue), is a rare charge in heraldry of uncertain meaning and purpose. It originates from England and is still largely exclusive to that country, though latterly it has been imported to other Anglophone nations. In Canadian heraldry, it is the cadency mark of a ninth daughter. 

It is generally said to represent a kind of wind instrument such as a panpipe or recorder, but does not resemble the trumpet-like clarion known to modern musicians. It may also be intended as an overhead view of a keyboard instrument such as a spinet. Alternatively it has been said to represent a 'rest', a device used by mediaeval knights to support a lance during jousting. In his Display of Heraldry John Guillim suggests that it may be a rudder. 'Clarion' is also the name given to a stop on an organ which imitates the sound of a trumpet.

External links

 Clarion: illustration and discussion by François Velde.  Accessed March 6, 2010.
 Clarion, Claricord, Organ Rest, Rest, Sufflue: illustration and brief description.  Accessed March 6, 2010.
  The Meanings Behind the Symbols: Clarion: heraldic charge illustrated, and interpreted as meaning "ready for war."  This meaning is compatible with the idiom clarion call, meaning an irresistible summons (as to war).  Accessed March 6, 2010.
 Coats of arms of Case Western Reserve University and its predecessors. A description of the arms used by the School of Applied Science / Case Institute of Technology (1942–1967). The clarion is in the 6th image.  Accessed March 6, 2010.

References

Heraldic charges